= Cultural and Scientific Treasuries =

Cultural and Scientific Treasuries is a 13-part Iranian television documentary series by Mahmoud Shoolizadeh. In this series, precious Iranian handwritten manuscripts are analysed in each episode according to their subjects such as astronomy, history, politics, economy, medicine, religion, Koran, calligraphy, painting, miniature, travel literature and illumination.

== Technical specifications and film crew ==
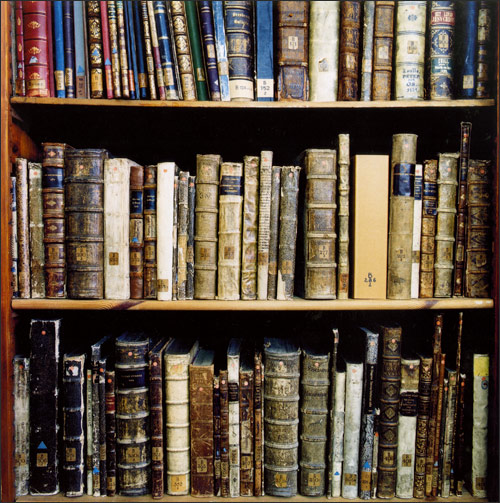
A collection of old, hand-written books, in the National Library of Iran

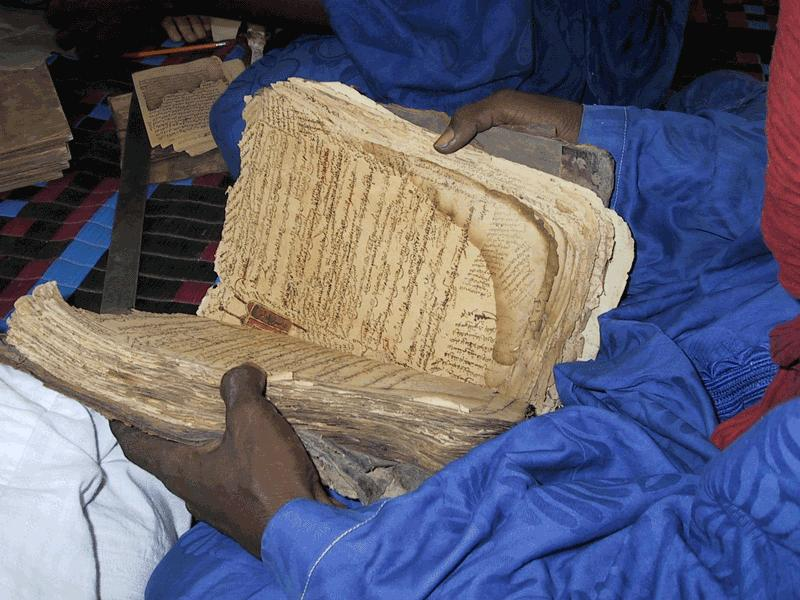
The National Library of Iran has a collection of old books including many rare and valuable hand-written books

- Betacam SP, 13 parts, each 15 min, Documentary, Iran, 1996
- Researcher, script writer and director: Mahmoud Shoolizadeh
- Producer: Javad Najmeddin (Aftab TV, USA)
